Oliver Wilson (born 22 March 2000) is a professional rugby league footballer who plays as a  for the Huddersfield Giants in the Betfred Super League.

He has previously played for Bradford in League 1 and the Championship, and spent time on loan from Huddersfield at Halifax in the Championship.

Playing career

Bradford Bulls
Between 2018 and 2019 he played for the Bradford Bulls.

Huddersfield Giants
Wilson left Bradford and became a part of Huddersfield's academy team, eventually becoming a first team regular.
Wilson has spent time on loan from Huddersfield at Halifax in the Betfred Championship.
In 2019, he made his Super League début for Huddersfield against Salford.
On 28 May 2022, he played for Huddersfield in their 2022 Challenge Cup Final loss to Wigan.

Bradford Bulls (loan)
On 26 May 2021 it was reported that he had signed for the Bradford Bulls in the RFL Championship on loan.

References

External links
Huddersfield Giants profile
SL profile
Bradford Bulls profile

2000 births
Living people
Bradford Bulls players
English rugby league players
Halifax R.L.F.C. players
Huddersfield Giants players
Rugby league props